Miastor metraloas is a species of midges in the family Cecidomyiidae.

References

Further reading

 
 

Cecidomyiidae
Articles created by Qbugbot
Insects described in 1864